Chylismia claviformis is a species of wildflower known as browneyes or brown-eyed primrose native to North America. This species is found across western North America from the Pacific Northwest to northern Mexico.

Description
It is an annual plant growing from a basal rosette of long oval leaves and producing stems often exceeding half a meter in height. Atop the stem is an inflorescence of one to many primrose blooms, each with four white or yellow petals. The pistil may be quite long and has a bulbous stigma at the tip. The stamens are somewhat shorter and they bear long hairy anthers containing white or yellow pollen. The floral axis at the junction of male and female parts is bright red to maroon or brown.

Subspecies
There are many subspecies:
C. c. ssp. aurantiaca – found in desert regions
C. c. ssp. claviformis – native to the Mojave Desert and nearby
C. c. ssp. cruciformis – native to the Great Basin region
C. c. ssp. funerea – native to the Mojave Desert
C. c. ssp. integrior 
C. c. ssp. lancifolia – (lanceleaf browneyes) – California east of the Sierra Nevada
C. c. ssp. peeblesii – (Peebles' browneyes) – found in Arizona and New Mexico
C. c. ssp. peirsonii – (Peirson's browneyes) – native to Southern California and northern Baja California
C. c. ssp. rubescens – native to Arizona
C. c. ssp. wigginsii
C. c. ssp. yumae – (Yuma browneyes) – found in the Sonoran Desert

External links
Jepson Manual Treatment
Photo gallery

claviformis
Flora of the California desert regions
Plants described in 1845
Flora without expected TNC conservation status